Sander Gillé and Joran Vliegen were the defending champions but only Vliegen chose to defend his title, partnering Rameez Junaid. Vliegen lost in the quarterfinals to Pedro Martínez and David Vega Hernández.

Elliot Benchetrit and Geoffrey Blancaneaux won the title after defeating Hsieh Cheng-peng and Luca Margaroli 6–3, 4–6, [10–7] in the final.

Seeds

Draw

References
 Main Draw

Open Sopra Steria de Lyon - Doubles
2018 Doubles